Rinorea fausteana is a species of plant in the Violaceae family. It is endemic to Cameroon.  Its natural habitats are subtropical or tropical moist lowland forests and subtropical or tropical moist montane forests. It is threatened by habitat loss.

References

Endemic flora of Cameroon
fausteana
Endangered plants
Taxonomy articles created by Polbot